Toryanoye is a rural locality (a selo) in Dubovskoye Rural Settlement, Yelansky District, Volgograd Oblast, Russia. The population was 344 as of 2010. There are 9 streets.

Geography 
Toryanoye is located on Khopyorsko-Buzulukskaya Plain, on the bank of the Yelan River, 22 km northwest of Yelan (the district's administrative centre) by road. Babinkino is the nearest rural locality.

References 

Rural localities in Yelansky District